Stefano Lo Russo (born 15 October 1975) is an Italian academic and politician, incumbent mayor of Turin.

Biography
His father comes from Foggia and his mother from Villafranca Piemonte.
University professor of applied geology at the Polytechnic of Turin, he entered the city council of Turin for the first time in 2006, elected on the Olive Tree list. Re-elected in 2011 with the Democratic Party, he then assumes the position of party group leader; in 2013 he became councilor for urban planning in the junta led by Piero Fassino. In 2016, after the victory of Chiara Appendino, he returned to occupy the role of party group leader of the Democratic Party.

Mayor of Turin
In 2021, after winning the centre-left internal primary, he ranks as mayor of his city in view of the local elections. After obtaining 43.9% in the first round, he was elected in the run-off on October 18 with 59.23% of the votes against the centre-right challenger Paolo Damilano. He was inaugurated October 27, 2021.

Notes

1975 births
Living people
Italian geologists
Democratic Party (Italy) politicians
21st-century Italian politicians
Mayors of Turin
University of Turin alumni
Polytechnic University of Turin alumni